The Ranganatha Swamy Temple at Nirthadi (also spelt Neerthadi or Niratadi), is a post-Vijayanagara Empire re-construction. Nirthadi is a village in the Davangere district of Karnataka state, India. According to noted historian and epigraphist Benjamin Lewis Rice, a Kannada language inscription dated 1698 AD in the temple premise describes the destruction of the original temple by the armies of Mogul emperor Aurangzeb in 1696 AD. The Chitradurga chief Baramappa Nayaka (r.1689–1721) rebuilt the temple in 1698 AD. The monument is protected by the Karnataka state division of Archaeological Survey of India.

Gallery

Notes

References
 Epigraphia Carnatica: Inscriptions in the Chitaldroog District, Benjamin Lewis Rice, volumn xi, Mysore Government Central Press, Carnatic (India) 1903.

Hindu temples in Chitradurga district
17th-century Hindu temples